Stenidea fairmairei is a species of beetle in the family Cerambycidae. It was described by Per Olof Christopher Aurivillius in 1922. It is known from Djibouti, Ethiopia, Kenya, Somalia, Sudan, Tanzania and Zanzibar.

References

densevestita
Beetles described in 1922